Furmanivka may refer to the following places in Ukraine:
 Furmanivka, village in Kamianets-Podilskyi Raion, Khmelnytskyi Oblast
 Furmanivka, village in Novoukrainka Raion, Kirovohrad Oblast
 Furmanivka, village in Kiliya Raion, Odessa Oblast